The Paulo Afonso Hydroelectric Complex (Complexo Hidrelétrico de Paulo Afonso), also known as the Paulo Afonso Complex, is a system of three dams and five hydroelectric power plants on the São Francisco River near the city of Paulo Afonso in Bahia, Brazil. The complex exploits an  natural gap on the river, known as the Paulo Afonso Falls.

PA I was the first large power plant constructed in Brazil and the complex constitutes the densest area of dams in Brazil. The complex provides electricity to areas in northeastern Brazil and is the main tourist attraction in the region.

Background and history
On January 23, 1913, the 1.1 MW Angiquinho Hydroelectric Plant, built by industrialist Delmiro Gouveia, was the first use of the Paulo Afonso Falls for power production and the first hydroelectric power plant in northeastern Brazil. Construction of the power plant was intended to spur economic growth in the area and soon after another hydroelectric plant was constructed upstream near Petrolândia. By the 1940s Brazil's Ministry of Agriculture recognized the importance of harnessing the São Francisco River for economic development in the semi-arid region. They began to plan the river's development and the Companhia Hidro-Elétrica do São Francisco (CHESF) was formed in 1945. On May 23, 1944, construction on Paulo Afonso I had been authorized with two generators. Construction began in 1948; workers and engineers experienced difficulty diverting the river, transporting the turbines to the site while in midst of dangerous work conditions. Tunnels and a cavern had to be excavated for Brazil's first underground power plant. Due to the depth and strength of the river near the falls, it was not diverted until 1954. On January 15, 1955, Brazilian President João Café Filho inaugurated PA I. Previously, in 1953, CHESF negotiated with the government for a third generating unit at PA I and the excavation of another underground power plant for the future PA II adjacent to PA I on the falls. The third generator at PA I was commissioned on September 18, 1955 and construction of PA II began that year as well.

By 1961, PA II was complete and on October 24 that year, its first generator was commissioned. PA II's five other generators became operational between 1962 and December 18, 1967. Construction on PA III started soon after in 1967 and was complete in 1971 with its first generator commissioned on October 21 that year. Another generator was commissioned in 1972 and the final two in 1974, the last of which on August 5. In 1977, construction was completed and its four generators went online in April of that year. Construction was complete in 1979 and its first generator commissioned on December 1. Two more generators were commissioned in 1980, two in 1981 and the final on May 28, 1983.

Specifications

Apollonius Sales (Moxotó)
The Appollonius Sales Dam and power plant were originally known as Moxotó but were renamed after Appollonius Sales, the founder of CHESF. The dam and its reservoir are primarily intended to regulate water flow to PA I, II and III 4 km downstream. On the dam's west side, it supports a 20 floodgate spillway with a  capacity. The power plant is located on the east side of the dam near the reservoir's shore and contains four generators, each with Kaplan turbines.

Paulo Afonso I, II, III

Situated directly on top of the Paulo Afonso Falls, the Delmiro Gouveia Dam supports Paulo Afonso I, II and III. The dam has one uncontrolled spillway and a controlled spillway on its outer linings while also supporting four controlled spillways on the front of the falls. These four surface spillways when open, discharge water below and essentially recreate the falls.

All three power plants are about  underground and adjacent to one another. The generators are Vertical Sync-type and were manufactured by Westinghouse. The turbines were manufactured by Dominion Engineering Works. It contains six Vertical Sync-type generators with Francis turbines. The generators were manufactured by S. Morgan Smith and Hitachi while the turbines by Voith. Each generator utilizes a Francis turbine manufactured by Voith.

Paulo Afonso IV
The reservoir receives water through a channel that originates near the southern end of the Appolonius Sales Reservoir and continues south, skirting the city. Each generator is a SíncronoVertical-type manufactured by Siemens and utilizes vertical shaft Francis turbines that were manufactured by Voith.

See also

 List of power stations in Brazil

References

External links

CHESF - Paulo Afonso Hydroelectric Complex

Dams in Bahia
Dams on the São Francisco River
Energy infrastructure completed in 1955
Energy infrastructure completed in 1967
Energy infrastructure completed in 1974
Energy infrastructure completed in 1983
Energy infrastructure completed in 1977
Underground power stations
1955 establishments in Brazil